The Independent is a 2022 American political film directed by Amy Rice and written by Evan Parter. It stars Jodie Turner-Smith, Brian Cox, Luke Kirby, Stephen Lang, Ann Dowd, and John Cena. The plot centers around a reporter who uncovers a conspiracy that could impact the results of an upcoming presidential election. The film was released on streaming by Peacock on November 2, 2022.

Plot
Elisha "Eli" James, a reporter at the Washington Chronicle, breaks the story that Yale University alum, Olympic gold medalist, and best-selling author Nate Sterling is running as an independent in the upcoming presidential election. His opponents are the unpopular Democratic incumbent and Senator Patricia Turnbull, a Republican who, if elected, would be the first female president of the United States. Eli befriends her idol, Nick Booker. She tells him that she has uncovered a conspiracy: Turnbull is embezzling funds from the lottery (specifically $1 for every $1000) and smuggling them into her Super PAC (political action committee) at the expense of the country's public schools. Near the end of the election, Eli and Booker discover that the perpetrator of the fraud is not Turnbull but Sterling. They talk to Sterling and get him to confess his involvement. Meanwhile, Eli's father dies of cancer. Another journalist tries to take credit for Eli's report. Instead of publishing it, the Washington Chronicle fires the journalist. Eli and Booker decide to start a new news publication, The Independent, to inform the American people of the truth. They publish the report on Sterling and leave the Washington Chronicle.

Cast
 Jodie Turner-Smith as Elisha "Eli" James
 Brian Cox as Nick Booker
 Ann Dowd as Patricia Turnbull, a political candidate who, if elected, would become the first female president of the United States
 John Cena as Nate Sterling, an independent running for office
 Luke Kirby as Lucas Nicoll
 Stephen Lang as Gordon White
 Margaret Odette as Jennifer Cooke
 Michael Gandolfini as Justin
 Alysia Reiner as Kathy Gibbs
 Imani Love as Lieutenant Penelope "Penny" James

Production
The Independent is a co-production between Anonymous Content, Park Pictures, and The Exchange. In 2013, Evan Parter's screenplay for the film ended up on The Black List, an annual survey of the most popular screenplays that had not yet been produced. According to the survey, which polled over 250 film executives, his screenplay received twenty votes for "best" screenplay, tying with Frank John Hughes's Pox Americana and Lisa Joy Nolan's Reminiscence. In February 2020, Amy Rice came on board to direct and Kumail Nanjiani joined the cast. Rice said the story "merges two worlds that I am very passionate about, which are journalism and politics." She cited Aaron Sorkin's The Newsroom, Chris Hegedus and D. A. Pennebaker's The War Room, and the series House of Cards as major influences. In September 2021, Jodie Turner-Smith, Brian Cox, John Cena, and Kathy Bates were added to the cast, with Nanjiani dropping out. In December, Ann Dowd was cast, replacing Bates who departed due to scheduling conflicts. Principal photography, originally scheduled to begin in November 2021, was confirmed to have begun the following month in New York City around 24th Street and 6th Avenue.

Release
The film was released on streaming on Peacock on November 2, 2022.

Reception
On the review aggregator website Rotten Tomatoes, the film has a 33% approval rating based on 12 reviews, with an average rating of 4.5/10. Metacritic, which uses a weighted average, assigned a score of 46 out of 100 based on 5 critics, indicating "mixed or average reviews".

References

External links
 

2020s American films
2020s English-language films
2020s political thriller films
American political thriller films
Anonymous Content films
Films about American politicians
Films about journalists
Films about presidential elections
Films shot in New York City
Relativity Media films